Min-speaking peoples are a major subgroup of ethnic Han Chinese people, speaking Min Chinese languages. They mainly live or trace roots from Fujian, Hainan, Southern Zhejiang and Guangdong province's Leizhou and Chaoshan regions. In the Chinese diaspora, they form the majority of people in Taiwan and the majority of Han Chinese in Southeast Asian countries, like Thailand, Cambodia, Myanmar, Malaysia, Singapore, and the Philippines. The first two countries have majority Teochew-speaking Chinese minorities, whereas the last four house Hokkien-speaking Chinese minorities.

Subgroups

Mainland China

Fujian 
 Min Bei people 閩北人 (Northern Min)
 Fuzhou people 福州人 (Eastern Min)
 Putian people 莆田人 (Pu-Xian Min)
 Hokkien people 閩南人 (Hokkien Southern Min)

Guangdong 
 Teochew people 潮州人 (Teo-Swa Southern Min)
 Leizhou people 雷州人 (Qiong–Lei Min)
 Zhongshan people 中山閩人 (Zhongshan Min)

Zhejiang 
 Zhenan Min 浙南閩人 (Southern Min)

Hainan 
 Hainanese people 海南人 (Qiong–Lei Min)

Japan 
 Thirty-six families from Min

Taiwan 
 Hoklo Taiwanese (Hokkien Southern Min)

Philippines  
 Hokkien Chinese Filipinos (Hokkien Southern Min)

Brunei  
 Hokkien Chinese Bruneians (Hokkien Southern Min)

Malaysia  
 Hokkien Malaysian Chinese (Hokkien Southern Min)
 Hainanese Malaysian Chinese (Qiong–Lei Min)
 Foochow Malaysian Chinese (Eastern Min)
 Teochew Malaysian Chinese (Teo-Swa Southern Min)
 Hockchia Malaysian Chinese (Eastern Min)

Singapore  
 Hokkien Chinese Singaporeans (Hokkien Southern Min)
 Teochew Chinese Singaporeans (Teo-Swa Southern Min)
 Hainanese Chinese Singaporeans (Qiong–Lei Min)
 Foochow Chinese Singaporeans (Eastern Min)
 Henghua Chinese Singaporeans (Pu-Xian Min)
 Hockchia Chinese Singaporeans (Eastern Min)

Indonesia  
 Hokkien Chinese Indonesians (Hokkien Southern Min)
 Teochew Chinese Indonesians (Teo-Swa Southern Min)
 Hainanese Chinese Indonesians (Qiong–Lei Min)
 Luichew Chinese Indonesians (Qiong–Lei Min)
 Hokciu Chinese Indonesians (Eastern Min)
 Hokcia Chinese Indonesians (Eastern Min)
 Hinghwa Chinese Indonesians (Pu-Xian Min)

Myanmar  
 Hokkien Chinese Burmese (Hokkien Southern Min)

Thailand  
 Teochew Thai Chinese (Teo-Swa Southern Min)
 Hainanese Thai Chinese (Qiong–Lei Min)
 Hokkien Thai Chinese (Hokkien Southern Min)

Cambodia  
 Teochew Chinese Cambodians (Teo-Swa Southern Min)
 Hainanese Chinese Cambodians (Qiong–Lei Min)
 Hokkien Chinese Cambodians (Hokkien Southern Min)

Vietnam  
 Teochew Hoa people (Teo-Swa Southern Min)
 Hokkien Hoa people (Hokkien Southern Min)
 Hainanese Hoa people (Qiong–Lei Min)

Madagascar 
 Hokkien Sinoa (Hokkien Southern Min)

See also 
 Chinese people
 Han Chinese
 Min Chinese

References 

Subgroups of the Han Chinese
Ethnic groups in Malaysia
Ethnic groups in Singapore
Ethnic groups in Indonesia
Ethnic groups in the United States
Ethnic groups in Canada